..."Let Me Sing" is the ninth studio album by American singer Brenda Lee. The album was released December 9, 1963, on Decca Records and was produced by Owen Bradley. The album was the second and final album studio album released by Brenda Lee in 1963.

Background and content 
..."Let Me Sing" was recorded in five separate recording sessions between August 20, 1961, and May 29, 1963, at the Bradley Film and Recording Studio in Nashville, Tennessee, United States under the direction of producer Owen Bradley. ..."Let Me Sing" contained twelve tracks like all of her previous albums and contained many cover versions of Pop music songs and standards. The album remakes included "Night and Day" by Cole Porter, Bobby Darin's "You're the Reason I'm Leaving", "At Last" which was recently covered by Etta James, and "End of the World" by Skeeter Davis. Unlike Lee's previous release of 1963, ..."Let Me Sing" contained more recent cover versions of pop songs, mainly from the late 1950s and early 1960s. Greg Adams of AllMusic called the album's use of Pop standards to sound "fresh" unlike her prior releases. Adams reviewed the album and gave it three out of five stars. Adams stated, "..."Let Me Sing" manages to sound vital where very similar albums failed later in her career. Not surprisingly, Let Me Sing was also Lee's second-to-last Top 40 album." The album was originally released on a  rpm LP record upon its initial release, containing six songs on the "A-side" of the record and six songs on the "B-side" of the record. The album has since been reissued on a compact disc in both Paraguay and Japan.

Release 
..."Let Me Sing" released its first single over a year before its initial release. The first single "Break It to Me Gently" was released in January 1962, peaking at #4 on the Billboard Hot 100 and #46 on the UK Singles Chart in the United Kingdom. Its second single "Losing You" was released one year later in April 1963. The single peaked at #6 on the Billboard Hot 100, #2 on the Billboard Easy Listening chart, and #13 on the Billboard R&B chart. It became Lee's last single to chart on the R&B chart during her recording career. The single would also reach #10 on the UK Singles Chart. The album was officially released on December 9, 1963, on Decca Records, later peaking at #39 on the Billboard 200 albums chart.

Track listing 
Side one
"Night and Day" – (Cole Porter) 2:33
"End of the World" – (Sylvia Dee, Arthur Kent) 3:05
"Our Day Will Come" – (Mort Garson, Bob Hilliard) 2:32
"You're the Reason I'm Living" – (Bobby Darin) 2:24
"Break It to Me Gently" – (Diane Lampert, Joe Seneca) 2:35
"Where Are You?" – (Harold Adamson, Jimmy McHugh) 2:59

Side two
"When Your Lover Has Gone" – (Einar Aaron Swan) 2:09
"Losing You" – (Pierre Havet, Jean Renard, Carl Sigman) 2:28
"I Wanna Be Around" – (Johnny Mercer, Sadie Vimmerstedt) 2:07
"Out in the Cold Again" – (Rube Bloom, Ted Koehler) 3:08
"At Last" – (Mack Gordon, Harry Warren) 2:18
"There Goes My Heart" – (Benny Davis, Abner Silver) 2:47

Personnel 
 Brenton Banks – strings
 Harold Bradley – guitar
 Howard Carpenter – strings
 Floyd Cramer – piano
 Dottie Dillard – background vocals
 Ray Edenton – guitar
 Buddy Harman – drums
 Lillian Hunt – strings
 Anita Kerr – background vocals
 Douglas Kirkham – drums
 Brenda Lee – lead vocals
 Grady Martin – guitar
 Bob Moore – bass
 Louis Nunley – background vocals
 Boots Randolph – saxophone
 Vernel Richardson – strings
 Bill Wright – background vocals

Sales chart positions 
Album

Singles

References 

1963 albums
Brenda Lee albums
Albums produced by Owen Bradley
Decca Records albums